Markus Piso (born 16 July 1966) is an Austrian sailor. He competed in the men's 470 event at the 1992 Summer Olympics.

References

External links
 

1966 births
Living people
Austrian male sailors (sport)
Olympic sailors of Austria
Sailors at the 1992 Summer Olympics – 470
Sportspeople from Vienna